The Enrico Fermi Award is a scientific award conferred by the President of the United States. It is awarded to honor scientists of international stature for their lifetime achievement in the development, use, or production of energy. It was established in 1956 by the United States Department of Energy in memorial of Italian-American physicist Enrico Fermi and his work in the development of nuclear power. The recipient of the award receives $100,000, a certificate signed by the President and the Secretary of Energy, and a gold medal featuring the likeness of Enrico Fermi.

Previous winners
Source: US Department of Energy

See also

 List of engineering awards
 Prizes named after people
 List of things named after Enrico Fermi
 Vannevar Bush Award
 Ankusk Kapoor Award

References

External links

DOE website on the Fermi award

Enrico Fermi Award recipients
Physics awards
Engineering awards
Awards established in 1956
Lifetime achievement awards
1956 establishments in the United States
American science and technology awards
Enrico Fermi